The Royal Route in Warsaw, Poland, is a former communication route that led southward from the city's Old Town.  It now comprises a series of connecting Warsaw streets that feature a number of historic landmarks.

The Royal Route begins at Warsaw's Castle Square and runs south down  Krakowskie Przedmieście (Kraków Suburb Street), ulica Nowy Świat (New World Street), Aleje Ujazdowskie (Ujazdów Avenue), ulica Belwederska (Belweder Street) and  ulica Sobieskiego (Sobieski Street), finally to arrive at Wilanów (King Jan III Sobieski's personal residence).

The route, with other portions of Warsaw Old Town, is one of Poland's official national Historic Monuments (Pomnik historii) as designated September 16, 1994.  Its listing is maintained by the National Heritage Board of Poland.

Notable places on the Royal Route
 
 
 Krakowskie Przedmieście
 St. Anne's Church
 Tyszkiewicz Palace
 Carmelite Church
 Presidential Palace
 Potocki Palace
 Holy Cross Church
 Kazimierz Palace
 Nowy Świat Street
 Visitationist Church

 Staszic Palace
 Triple Cross Square
 St. Alexander's Church
 Ujazdów Avenue
 Ujazdów Park
 Ujazdów Castle
 Łazienki Park
 Łazienki Palace
 Belweder
 Wilanów Palace

See also

 Royal Road, Kraków

External links
Szczegółowe informacje o zabytkach na Trakcie Królewskim (Polish for:  Details about historic landmarks on the Royal Route).
Strategia Rozwoju Narodowego Produktu Turystycznego m. st. Warszawy Trakt Królewski do roku 2013 (Polish for:  Strategy for developing the tourist national product of Warsaw — the Royal Route).

Streets in Warsaw